The  is a private, interdisciplinary graduate school located in Onna, Okinawa Prefecture, Japan. The school offers a 5-year PhD program in Science. Over half of the faculty and students are recruited from outside Japan, and all education and research is conducted entirely in English.

OIST relies on public subsidies paid by the Japanese government. The government subsidy for OIST comes in two areas: a subsidy for operations and a subsidy for facilities.

History
In June 2001, Kōji Omi former Minister of State for Okinawa and Northern Territories Affairs and former Minister of State for Science and Technology Policy, announced plans to establish a new graduate university in Okinawa. A Board of Governors was appointed in 2004 and the following year, the Diet recognized OIST as an "Independent Administrative Institution". The first class of students were welcomed in September 2012 after receiving approval.

Academics

Graduate school
The PhD program is taught entirely in English and is individually tailored to each student. Students are encouraged to focus their research on cross-disciplinary areas of studies. Students are recruited through much higher levels of competition than that of the entrance examination for graduate schools of top national universities in Japan. As of May 2022, there were 242 enrolled PhD students from 50 countries. Of these students, 81% were international and 40% were identified as women.

Faculty 
As of May 2022, the 89 faculty at OIST–consisting of assistant, associate, and tenured professors–have been recruited globally. Of these 89 faculty, 62% are international and 18% are identified as being women.

Research
The research community consists of faculty and researchers divided into "units" based on area of study. The university has no departments—OIST researchers conduct multi-disciplinary research in Neuroscience, Physics, Chemistry, Mathematical and Computational Sciences, Molecular, Cellular, and Developmental Biology, Environmental and Ecological Sciences and Marine Science.

Ranking and Reputation
According to a 2015 report, completed by an external peer review panel, OIST is on a par with the 25 universities ranked highest
by Times Higher Education, QS or Jiaotong World University Rankings in terms of physical campus infrastructure, management structure and management processes, academic program and recruitment of faculty, graduate program, instrumentation, course to research outcome, technology transfer and welfare, social, and cultural support programs.

In 2019 OIST was ranked 1st in Japan and 9th in the world by the Nature Index for the proportion of its research that is published in high-quality science journals when normalised by size (360 unnormalised ranked). In the 2022 Nature Index, without normalisation for size, OIST ranked 14th in Japan and 372nd in the world.

See also 
King Abdullah University of Science and Technology

References

External links

 

Independent Administrative Institutions of Japan
2005 establishments in Japan
Biological research institutes
Independent research institutes
Research institutes in Japan
Neuroscience research centers in Japan
Educational institutions established in 2005
Universities and colleges in Okinawa Prefecture